The canton of Boulogne-sur-Mer-Sud  is a former canton situated in the department of the Pas-de-Calais and in the Nord-Pas-de-Calais region of northern France. It was disbanded following the French canton reorganisation which came into effect in March 2015. It had a total of 22,763 inhabitants (2012, without double counting).

Geography 
The canton is organised around Boulogne-sur-Mer in the arrondissement of Boulogne-sur-Mer. The altitude varies from 0m (Boulogne-sur-Mer) to 188m (Saint-Martin-Boulogne) for an average altitude of 46m.

The canton comprised 5 communes:
Baincthun
Boulogne-sur-Mer (partly)
Echinghen
Saint-Martin-Boulogne
La Capelle-lès-Boulogne

See also 
Cantons of Pas-de-Calais 
Communes of Pas-de-Calais 
Arrondissements of the Pas-de-Calais department

References

Boulogne-sur-Mer-Nord-Est
Boulogne-sur-Mer
2015 disestablishments in France
States and territories disestablished in 2015